Zu Pengchao (born 11 January 1997) is a Chinese footballer currently playing as a midfielder for Tianjin Jinmen.

Club career
Zu Pengchao would play for his local football club's Hangzhou Greentown youth team before representing the Zhejiang team in the U18 Men's 2013 National Games where his team came runners-up to Liaoning. He would sign for Shanghai Shenhua where he was sent to Spain to continue his football development until second tier football club Shenzhen signed him on 28 February 2017. He would be promoted to their senior team and would make his debut appearance on 12 March 2017 against Dalian Transcendence F.C. in a league game that ended in a 6-0 victory. He would gradually start to establish himself as a regular within the team and go on to gain promotion with the club at the end of the 2018 China League One campaign.

Career statistics

Club

Notes

References

External links

1997 births
Living people
Chinese footballers
Association football midfielders
China League One players
Chinese Super League players
Shenzhen F.C. players
Chinese expatriate footballers
Chinese expatriate sportspeople in Spain
Expatriate footballers in Spain